Csurgói Kézilabda Klub  is a Hungarian handball club from Csurgó, that plays in the Nemzeti Bajnokság I, the top level championship in Hungary.

Crest, colours, supporters

Naming history

Kit manufacturers and shirt sponsor

The following table shows in detail Csurgói KK kit manufacturers and shirt sponsors by year:

Kits

Sports Hall information
Name: – Sótonyi László Sportcsarnok
City: – Csurgó
Capacity: – 1200
Address: – 8840 Csurgó, Sárgáti utca 18.

Management

Team

Current squad 

Squad for the 2022–23 season

Technical staff
 Head coach:  Norbert Baranyai
 Assistant coach:  Darko Pavlović
 Goalkeeping coach:  Imre Szabó
 Fitness coach:  Levente Bakai
 Masseur:  Ferenc Gazda
 Club doctor:  Dr. Mária Dergez

Transfers
Transfers for the 2023–24 season

Joining 
  David Mazurek (RB) from  HC Zubří
  Tamás Papp (LP) from  NEKA

Leaving 
  Grega Krečič (RB) to  RK Celje

Previous squads

Top scorers

Retired numbers

Honours

Individual awards

Domestic
Nemzeti Bajnokság I Top Scorer

Recent seasons

Seasons in Nemzeti Bajnokság I: 11
Seasons in Nemzeti Bajnokság I/B: 3
Seasons in Nemzeti Bajnokság II: 17

European competition

EHF Cup: It was formerly known as the IHF Cup until 1993. Also, starting from the 2012–13 season the competition has been merged with the EHF Cup Winners' Cup. The competition will be known as the EHF European League from the 2020–21 season.

European record
As of 28 August 2021:

Overall results by opponent and country

EHF ranking

Former club members

Notable former players

 Sándor Bajusz
 László Bartucz
 Tamás Borsos
 Dániel Buday
 Tibor Cifra
 Tibor Dömös
 Rudolf Faluvégi
 Tamás Frey
 Tibor Gazdag
 Gábor Grebenár
 Egon Hanusz
 Gábor Herbert
 Péter Hornyák
 Henrik Hudák
 Máté Józsa
 Dávid Katzirz
 Péter Kovacsics
 Csaba Leimeter
 Ákos Lele
 Zoltán Miss
 Máté Nagy
 Gábor Oláh
 Ádám Országh
 Péter Pallag
 Bálint Pordán
 Márton Székely
 Szabolcs Szöllősi
 Péter Tatai
 Attila Tóth
 Ádám Tóth (2021–)
 József Tóth
 Marko Vasić
 György Zsigmond
 Gafar Hadžiomerović
 Mirko Herceg (2021–)
 Kosta Savić
 Marko Tarabochia
 Aleh Astrashapkin
 Barys Pukhouski
 Malandrin De Oliveira Rodolfo
 Da Silva Uelington Ferreira
 Nikola Kedžo
 Igor Kos
 Antonio Kovačević
 Bruno Kozina (2021–)
 Josip Pazin
 Matko Rotim (2021–)
 Garcia Alberto Aguirrezabalaga
 Darko Dimitrievski
 Stefan Čavor
 Rade Mijatović
 Piotr Wyszomirski
 Filipe Mota (2015–2016)
 Alvaro Rodrigues
 Klemen Cehte
 Grega Krečič
 Borut Oslak
 Gregor Potočnik
 Anže Ratajec
 Rok Zaponsek
 Đorđe Golubović
 Ljubomir Jošić
 Mladen Krsmančić
 Milan Kuzman
 Nebojša Nikolić
 Darko Pavlović
 Ivan Popović
 Bojan Rađenović
 Alem Toskic
 Darko Trivković
 Gojko Vuckovic
 Jakub Mikita
 Teodor Paul
 Gabriel Vadkerti
 Vladyslav Ostroushko

Former coaches

References

External links
  
 Csurgói KK at EHF 
 

Hungarian handball clubs
Somogy County